These are the Billboard magazine Hot Dance Club Play number one hits of 1982.

See also
1982 in music
List of number-one dance hits (United States)
List of artists who reached number one on the U.S. Dance chart

References

Some weeks may also be found at Billboard magazine courtesy of Google Books: 1980—1984.

1982
1982 in American music
1982 record charts